Alessandro Bernardini (born 21 January 1987) is a retired Italian footballer who plays as a defender.

Career

Youth & Serie D
Born in Domodossola, Province of Verbano-Cusio-Ossola, Bernardini started his youth career at province capital Verbania. He then signed a youth contract with Parma, where he played three seasons.

In summer 2006, he left for non-professional side Borgomanero in his home region Piedmont. He played 61 league matches and scored two goals.

Varese
He signed his first professional contract with Varese in summer 2008. In his second season, he became the definite stater, only missed two out of 20 league matches, while he missed the latter by sent off in a Round 18 rescheduled match against Perugia on 13 January 2010, which also his late match. He also played both two Coppa Italia match as stater, which were lost to Frosinone Calcio of Serie B in penalty shootout.

Livorno
After suspended on 17 January 2010 against Arezzo, he joined Serie A struggler Livorno in a co-ownership deal with Varese on 19 January 2010. He was presented along with another new player Andrea Esposito. Co-current with their arrival, Federico Dionisi who only played three league matches this season left the club on loan.

After the end of Serie A, he was borrowed by Juventus for the US tour, along with teammate Francesco Bardi and two other players.

Salernitana
On 18 July 2019, his contract with Salernitana was terminated by mutual consent.

References

External links
 
 Profile at Livorno 
 Profile at AIC.Football.it 

Italian footballers
Serie A players
Serie B players
S.S. Verbania Calcio players
Parma Calcio 1913 players
S.S.D. Varese Calcio players
U.S. Livorno 1915 players
A.C. ChievoVerona players
U.S. Salernitana 1919 players
Association football defenders
People from Domodossola
Footballers from Piedmont
1987 births
Living people
Sportspeople from the Province of Verbano-Cusio-Ossola